Paramolotra is a small genus of east Asian goblin spiders. It was first described by W. H. Cheng, D. J. Bian and Y. F. Tong in 2021, and it has only been found in China.  it contains only two species: P. metok and P. pome.

See also
 List of Oonopidae species

References

Oonopidae genera
Spiders of China